Zhao Youqin's  algorithm was an algorithm  devised by  Yuan dynasty Chinese astronomer and mathematician Zhao Youqin (? – 1330) to calculate the value of  in his book Ge Xiang Xin Shu.

Algorithm 
Zhao Youqin started with an inscribed square in a circle with radius r.

If  denotes the length of a side of the square, draw a perpendicular line d from the center of the circle to side l. Let e denotes r − d. Then from the diagram:

Extend the perpendicular line d to dissect the circle into an octagon;  denotes the length of one side of octagon.

Let   denotes the length of a side of hexadecagon

similarly

Proceeding in this way, he at last calculated the side of a 16384-gon, multiplying it by 16384 to obtain 3141.592 for a circle with diameter = 1000 units, or

He multiplied this number by 113 and obtained 355.

See also
Liu Hui's  algorithm

References

Chinese mathematics
Pi algorithms